Lake Kezenoy-am (Lake Goluboye,) is the deepest lake in the Caucasus Mountains, in the Russian Federation, mostly in Chechnya but partly in Dagestan. It goes through Andiyskiy Khrebet (Andian Ridge). It is situated at an altitude of 1870 m above sea level and fills an area of 2.4 km². The maximum depth of the lake is 74 m. In winter the surface of the lake freezes and in summer the water temperature is around 5 °C. The lake water has a year-round supply of oxygen in which plankton survive. Salmo ezenami, a rare species of trout, are native only to the lake; however, their population is threatened with extinction due to the introduction of European chubs (Squalius cephalus) which consume the fry of the Salmo.

See also

 List of lakes of Russia

References

 

Kezenoyam